Anton van Wouw (27 December 1862  30 July 1945) was a Dutch-born South African sculptor regarded as the father of South African sculpture.

Biography
Van Wouw decided to move to the developing city of Pretoria at the age of 28 and waited for ten years to receive his first commission. This was from financier Sammy Marks to create a monumental statue of Paul Kruger, which stands on Church Square.

During his time spent in the wilderness he developed a great admiration for the Boer nation. This also influenced his artistic development a great deal. He identified with the struggles and hopes of these people and this commitment was reflected in his work.

A great deal of his work, although representational, captures the rugged and emotional essence of his subjects. One of his most notable pieces of work is the figure of a woman used in the Women’s Monument near Bloemfontein. He collaborated on this with the architect Frans Soff. He was also responsible for the less successful figure of a woman incorporated into the Voortrekker Monument near Pretoria, a powerful bust of General Christiaan de Wet and the statue of Louis Botha in Durban.

He also portrayed indigenous peoples and among these smaller sculptures some of his finest work can be found. They are much less formal than his larger work and are appealing in their vivid and lifelike facial expressions.

Works

Woman and Children, completed in 1938. This bronze statue honouring the role the Voortrekker women played in the Great Trek was van Wouw's last commission. The sculpture is located at the base of the Voortrekker Monument in Pretoria, stands 4.1 meter tall and weights 2.5 ton. The casting was done by Renzo Vignali in Pretoria. Models for the statue were Cato Roorda or Isabel Snyman as the woman, Betty Wolk as the girl and Joseph Goldstein as the boy

Remembered
Laerskool Anton van Wouw is a primary school named after van Wouw in the Pretoria suburb of Brooklyn.
Van Wouw Museum located in his final residence.

Gallery

See also
 Van Wouw Museum
 The spatial symbolism of the Voortrekker Monument

References

External links
Anton van Wouw
Anton van Wouw House
Bust of MT Steyn
Arcy Art

 
1862 births
1945 deaths
Dutch emigrants to South Africa
Wouw, Anton Van
Wouw, Anton Van
Wouw, Anton Van
South African sculptors
20th-century sculptors
19th-century sculptors
20th-century South African sculptors